Anthene starki, the western black-spot ciliate blue, is a butterfly in the family Lycaenidae. It is found in Guinea, Burkina Faso, Ivory Coast, Ghana, Togo, Benin, north-central Cameroon, the Central African Republic, and the northern part of the Democratic Republic of the Congo. The habitat consists of Guinea savanna and dry forest mosaic.

Adult males mud-puddle. Adults have been recorded on wing in January.

Etymology
The species is named for Malcolm Stark.

References

Butterflies described in 2005
Anthene